Seafarers Music is a Will Oldham EP released in 2004. It is the soundtrack to the film Seafarers (2004) by British director Jason Massot, a documentary about four seamen in Rotterdam, Netherlands. Each of the album's tracks is named after one of the four sailors. The EP also features playing from Paul Oldham and David Bird.

Track listing
"Sapele" – 4:49
"Lars" – 8:20
"Bogo" – 8:30
"Emmanuel" – 5:36

2004 EPs
Will Oldham albums
Drag City (record label) EPs